The women's 400 metre individual medley event at the 2014 Commonwealth Games as part of the swimming programme took place on 24 July at the Tollcross International Swimming Centre in Glasgow, Scotland. Defending champion Hannah Miley retained her title, breaking her own Commonwealth Games record twice. Aimee Willmott took second and bronze was won by Australian Keryn McMaster.

The medals were presented by Prince Haji Sufri Bolkiah, President of the Brunei Darussalam National Olympic Council and the quaichs were presented by Michael Cavanagh, Chairman of Commonwealth Games Scotland.

Records
Prior to this competition, the existing world and Commonwealth Games records were as follows.

The following records were established during the competition:

Results

Heats

Final

References

Women's 0400 metre individual medley
Commonwealth Games
2014 in women's swimming